The fourth season of the Greek Cypriot reality talent show The Voice of Greece premiered on October 3, 2017 on Skai TV. Based on the reality singing competition The Voice of Holland, the series was created by Dutch television producer John de Mol. It is part of an international series.

On September 13, 2017, Skai TV confirmed that the presenter and the coaches of the previous season would return, while Laura Narges is coming to serving as the new backstage and social networking corresponding, replacing Elena Tsagkrinou.

Yiorgos Zioris won The Voice of Greece 2017 from Team Kostis Maraveyas.

Selection process

Pre-Auditions
The Pre-Auditions or Pre-Casting begins from Athens.

Filming
The Voice of Greece 4 began filming Blind Auditions at September 20, 2017 at Galatsi Olympic Hall. The Battle Round began filming on November 9, 2017 at Galatsi Olympic Hall, following the taping of the blind auditions.

Coaches and presenters
In June 2017, Elena Paparizou announced that she would like to take part, in two productions, in 'The Voice' and in the new production that bring in season 2017–2018 Skai TV 'Greece Got Talent' but the channel has decided to run both programs at the same time. On July 26, 2017, Panos Mouzourakis he had went in Cyprus and in an interview he said that "At the moment I remain in The Voice, unless I close something else that I am very happy about ...". On August 2, 2017, Sakis Rouvas and Elena Paparizou they announced in their Instagram that the pre-casting will begin. On September 13, 2017 Skai TV announced that the fourth coaches from the last season are coming back.

In July 2017 a different channel they said that Giorgos Kapoutzidis would came back to present the second season on Skai TV. On September 20, 2017 Skai TV announced that Laura Narjes is coming to serving as the new backstage and social networking corresponding, replacing Elena Tsagkrinou.

Teams
Color key

Blind auditions 
The blind auditions took place in the Galatsi Olympic Hall in Galatsi, Athens, Greece. Each coach had the length of the artists' performance to decide if they wanted that artist on their team. If two or more coaches have wanted the same artist, then the artist chose their coach. If only one wanted the artist, then the artist was defaulted in his team. Once the coaches picked their team, they pitted them against each other in the Battles.

The blind auditions episodes aired on October 3, 2017.

Color key

Episode 1 (October 3) 
The first blind audition episode was broadcast on October 3, 2017.

Episode 2 (October 4) 
The second blind audition episode was broadcast on October 4, 2017.

Episode 3 (October 5) 
The third blind audition episode was broadcast on October 5, 2017.

Episode 4 (October 11) 
The fourth blind audition episode was broadcast on October 11, 2017.

Episode 5 (October 12) 
The fifth blind audition episode was broadcast on October 12, 2017.

Episode 6 (October 18) 
The sixth blind audition episode was broadcast on October 18, 2017.

Episode 7 (October 19) 
The seventh blind audition episode was broadcast on October 19, 2017.

Episode 8 (October 25) 
The eight blind audition episode was broadcast on October 25, 2017.

Episode 9 (October 26) 
The ninth blind audition episode was broadcast on October 26, 2017.

Episode 10 (November 1) 
The tenth blind audition episode was broadcast on November 1, 2017.

Episode 11 (November 2) 
The eleven blind audition episode was broadcast on November 2, 2017.

Episode 12 (November 7) 
The twelve blind audition episode was broadcast on November 7, 2017.

Episode 13 (November 8) 
The thirteen blind audition episode was broadcast on November 8, 2017.

Episode 14 (November 15) 
The final blind audition episode was broadcast on November 15, 2017.

Battle rounds
Filming for the battles began on November 9, 2017 at Galatsi Olympic Hall, following the taping of the blind auditions. Each coach has only one steal.

The first part of the battle rounds was broadcast on November 16, 2017 until November 28, 2017.

Colour key

Episode 1 (November 16)
The first battle round episode was broadcast on November 16, 2017.

Episode 2 (November 21)
The second battle round episode was broadcast on November 21, 2017.

Episode 3 (November 22)
The third battle round episode was broadcast on November 22, 2017.

Episode 4 (November 23)
The fourth battle round episode was broadcast on November 23, 2017.

Episode 5 (November 28)
The final battle round episode was broadcast on November 28, 2017.

Knockouts
Filming for the knockouts began in November 2017 at Galatsi Olympic Hall, following the taping of the blind auditions and battle rounds. Each coach has only two steal.

The Knockouts rounds was broadcast from November 29, 2017 until December 5, 2017.

Colour key

Live shows

Color key

Week 1

Cross Battle 1 (December 6)

Cross Battle 2 (December 7)

Week 2

Semi-Final 1 (December 13)

Semi-Final 2 (December 14)

Week 3

Final (December 20)

Round 1

Round 2

Round 3

Ratings

References

External links
 

Season 4
Voice of Greece 2017